The York and Lancaster Regiment War Memorial (or York and Lancaster Memorial) is a war memorial to members of the York and Lancaster Regiment, in Weston Park, Sheffield, England. It was erected in the park in 1923 to commemorate the 8,814 members of the regiment who died in the First World War.
The original inscription (all in upper case) reads:

An inscription commemorating the victims of the Second World War was added after that conflict ended:

The monument consists of a winged female figure, variously described as Liberty or Victory, mounted on a granite ashlar obelisk with a stone stepped-base, with two attendant bronze figures of a helmeted officer with a drawn pistol, and a private with a Lee-Enfield rifle. The memorial cost £12,000, which was raised by a 'York and Lancaster Memorial Committee', through public subscription.

Sheffield Technical School of Art were invited to design the memorial. The female figure is by a lecturer, Francis Jahn, while the statues of soldiers, inscribed "E J Parlanti founder, London", are by two students, Roy Smith (the officer) and G N Morewood. Other students acted as models. Smith also provided the stone carving at the base of the reverse of the monument, as well as the overall design, which was previously and erroneously attributed to Charles Sargeant Jagger, who had also taught at Sheffield.

The memorial was unveiled by Field Marshall Herbert Plumer on 7 July 1923.

It was Grade II listed in June 1973, giving it legal protection from unauthorised alteration or demolition.

The memorial should not be confused with the York and Lancaster Regiment Boer War memorial, which stands adjacent.

References 

Grade II listed buildings in Sheffield
World War I memorials in England
World War II memorials in England
Bronze sculptures in the United Kingdom
Grade II listed monuments and memorials
Buildings and structures completed in 1923
British military memorials and cemeteries
York and Lancaster Regiment